"Can't Catch Tomorrow (Good Shoes Won't Save You This Time)" is the third single from the album Liberation Transmission, the third studio album by Welsh band Lostprophets. It entered the UK singles chart at 35, the lowest position yet for a single from Liberation Transmission.

The band worked with Ryan Smith on the music video for this song. The video was filmed in Los Angeles and is inspired by the 1970s mod film Quadrophenia.

The shoes on the cover art are derived from a competition where fans were asked to take Polaroid pictures of their shoes. The winning submissions made the cover.

Track listing

Personnel
 Ian Watkins – lead vocals
 Lee Gaze – lead guitar
 Mike Lewis – rhythm guitar
 Stuart Richardson – bass guitar
 Jamie Oliver – piano, keyboard, samples, vocals
 Josh Freese – drums, percussion 
 Ilan Rubin – drums, percussion

Chart positions

References

2006 singles
2006 songs
Lostprophets songs
Song recordings produced by Bob Rock
Columbia Records singles